William Chinyama (born 18 April 1984) is a Zambian defender with ZESCO United F.C. in Zambia.He has 3 international caps for Zambia.

Career
Chinyama is a product of the GVM soccer academy which was founded by 1997 COSAFA Castle Cup, winning coach, the late George Mungwa. But it was at FAZ Division one side Forest Rangers that he started to realize his potential.

With ZESCO United, Chinyama started slowly but as season progressed he grew in stature and he earned a call up to the national team in 2007.

The right footed defender made his international debut in the Ghana 2008 African Cup of nations qualifiers in 1-1 draw against Chad at Chililabombwe’s Konkola Stadium. His impressive display at left full back won him praise from many soccer pundits and fans.
The Lusaka born was dropped from the starting XI in the final match against South Africa as long serving Joseph Musonda was preferred.

Despite being the understudy to first choice full backs; Clive Hachilensa and Musonda, many see him the better of the trio.

In 2007, Chinyama helped ZESCO united win a domestic treble as they won the KCM/FAZ Premier League title, Coca-Cola Cup and inaugural Barclays Cup. ‘Team Ya Ziko’ also won the season opener; the Samuel ‘Zoom’ Ndhlovu Charity shield and lost to Red Arrows in the MOSI cup final.

Honours
ZESCO United
Champions
Zambia Super League: 2007
Barclays Cup: 2007
Zambian Charity Shield: 2007

External links
 Zambia Football
 
 
 

Living people
1984 births
Zambian footballers
Zambia international footballers
2008 Africa Cup of Nations players
Sportspeople from Lusaka
ZESCO United F.C. players
Association football defenders
Forest Rangers F.C. players